Della M. Newman (born June 6, 1932) is an American businesswoman who served as the United States Ambassador to New Zealand and Samoa from 1989 to 1992.

Newman chaired George H.W. Bush's campaign in Washington state.  At the time of her appointment, she was a realty owner and headed the Association of Washington Business, the state's main business lobbying group. Despite never having been to New Zealand, “Newman felt she was asked to fill the ambassador's post because of her party activism and because of similarities between New Zealand and the Pacific Northwest.  ‘New Zealand has a similar climate, they speak English and they are on the Pacific Rim,' she said.”

Senator Paul Sarbanes criticized President Bush for his unusually high percentage of political appointees to ambassadorships.  According to the Los Angeles Times: Bush has announced 42 ambassadorial appointments, of which only 14--one-third of the total--have gone to career diplomats. Of the rest, 21 are strictly political, including several persons who had contributed more than $100,000 to Bush’s campaign coffers; the other seven are legally classified as political because they are not members of the nonpartisan Foreign Service, although they are foreign policy professionals who served in previous Republican administrations. Newman's appointment was one of three put on hold because they “were judged to be unqualified by the American Academy of Diplomacy.”  Cited was the fact that not only was she the State Chair of his campaign, but also that her husband was a major contributor.

References

1932 births
Living people
Ambassadors of the United States to New Zealand
Ambassadors of the United States to Samoa
Washington (state) Republicans
American women ambassadors
20th-century American diplomats
20th-century American women
21st-century American women